The Patriotic Front for Change is a political party in Burkina Faso. 
At the previous legislative elections on 5 May 2002, the party won 0.5% of the popular vote and 1 out of 111 seats.

Political parties in Burkina Faso